Arnaut Osman is a hero of Serbian, Albanian, and Bosniak epic poetry. The Serbo-Croatian language songs about Arnaut Osman include Young Marjan and Arnaut Osman, Sekula and Arnaut Osman and Mujo Hrnjica kills Simun Brehulja. Albanian language songs about Arnaut Osman include Sirotan Alia and Arnaut Osman. The name of this here consists of personal name Osman and ethnonym Arnaut (Albanian).

Epic poetry on Serbo-Croatian language 
The song Young Marjan and Arnaut Osman was recorded by Vuk Karadžić (Narodne srpske pjesme III, Lajpcig, 1823), based on the singing of Anđelko Vuković from Kosovo (from whose singing Vuk recorded totally four songs). The main motif of this song is brotherhood and conciliation.

Another song recorded by Vuk Karadžić (also in 1823) is titled Sekula and Arnaut Osman

The song Mujo Hrnjica kills Simun Brehulja is evidence that Arnaut Osman was one of famous bayraktars in the epic poetry of Bosniaks. In this song, Christian hero Siun Brehulja inflicted deadly wounds to Arnaut Osman and killed cheteniks under his command.

Some singers of this song referred to Osman as Captain Osman instead of Arnaut Osman. Some variants of this song are titled Mujo Hrnjica Liberates His Blood-Brother Arnaut Osman

Arnaut Osman is one of the heroes of the novel written by Đura Jakšić.

Epic poetry on Albanian language 
Arnaut Osman is also a hero of the Albanian epic poetry. He is one of main characters in the song Sirotan Alia and Arnaut Osman Albanian epic poetry had almost identic song to song about Mali Radojica, although the name of the hero is not Mali Radojica but Arnaut Osman.

References

External links 
 Young Marjan and Arnaut Osman - Serbian language text on National Library of Serbia website

Characters in Serbian epic poetry
Characters in Albanian epic poetry
Bosniak culture
Fictional people from Kosovo